Donaldson Gray (23 September 1880 – 16 April 1961) was a New Zealand rugby union player. A first five-eighth, Gray represented  at a provincial level, and was a member of the New Zealand national side, the All Blacks, in 1908 and 1913. He played 14 matches for the All Blacks including three internationals.

A timber worker, Gray died in Christchurch on 16 April 1961, and was buried at Sydenham Cemetery.

References

1880 births
1961 deaths
Rugby union players from Christchurch
New Zealand rugby union players
New Zealand international rugby union players
Canterbury rugby union players
Rugby union fly-halves
Burials at Sydenham Cemetery